Bacchisa cavernifera is a species of beetle in the family Cerambycidae. It was described by Per Olof Christopher Aurivillius in 1922 and is known from Java, Sumatra, and the Philippines.

References

C
Beetles described in 1922